Microsoft Internet Explorer 2 (IE2) is the second, and by now discontinued, version of Internet Explorer (IE), a graphical web browser by Microsoft. It was unveiled in October 1995, and was released on November 22, 1995, for Windows 95 and Windows NT, and on April 23, 1996, for Apple Macintosh and Windows 3.1.

Version 2 launched with 12 languages, including English, but this would expand to 24 for Windows 95, 20 for Windows 3.1, and 9 for the Macintosh by April 1996. It lacked many features that became common in later IE versions, including the Blue 'e' logo, integration with Windows Explorer, and bundled programs. Its market share was also much lower than later versions. During its tenure, IE market share only went up to about roughly 3-9% by mid 1996, before Internet Explorer 3 was released.

It is the last version of Internet Explorer to support Windows NT 3.1; as the following version, Internet Explorer 3, only supports Windows NT 3.5.

Internet Explorer 2 is no longer supported, and is not available for download from Microsoft.

History
IE replicated many of the quirks of Netscape Navigator, and allowed importing bookmarks from it. In May 1996, FTP Software announced it was providing Microsoft with various technology for Internet Explorer 2.0 for Windows 3.1, including a PPP network, 16-bit email client, and other technology.

Availability
Internet Explorer version 2 was released in beta in October 1995, only 2 months after version 1 came out in Microsoft Plus! for 95 that August. It was released for Windows 95 and Windows NT 3.1 in November 1995 and was bundled with NT 4.0 in July 1996. The Beta for Mac on PowerPC came out in January, and the finalized version in April for 68k and PowerPC. Version 2 was also the first release for Windows 3.1 and Macintosh System 7.0.1(PPC or 68k), although the Mac version was not released until January 1996 for PPC, and April for 68k. Version 2 was included in Windows 95 OEM Service Release (OSR 1) and Microsoft's Internet Starter Kit for Windows 95 in early 1996. It launched with twelve languages, including English, but this expanded to 24, 20, and 9 for Win 95, Win 3.1 and Mac respectively by April 1996. The 2.0i version supported double-byte character-sets for supporting  Chinese, Japanese or Korean characters in web pages. Version 2.1 for the Mac came out in August 1996, the same month version 2 for Windows was superseded by Microsoft Internet Explorer 3. There were 16-bit and 32-bit versions depending on the OS.

Mac version
The Mac version, especially version 2.1, was praised for being economic with resources and for new features. Internet Explorer supported the embedding of a number of multimedia formats into web pages, including AVI and QuickTime formatted video and AIFF, MIDI and WAV formatted audio. The non-beta final version was released three months later on April 23, 1996. Version 2.1 fixed bugs and improving stability, but also added a few features such as support for the NPAPI (the first version of Internet Explorer on any platform to do so) and support for QuickTime VR. AOL 3.0 for Macintosh used the IE 2.1 rendering engine in its built-in web browser. The various 16 and 32 bit versions largely depended on the OS although Windows NT would use the 16 bit versions for Windows 3.1.

Features
IE2 introduced new or improved features for its time period. Many soon became ubiquitous (such as cookies) while others such as the integrated email client were removed in later versions due to being out of scope and better covered by dedicated software like Outlook. The features are:

 Secure Sockets Layer (SSL) protocol
 HTTP cookies
 Virtual Reality Modeling Language (VRML)
 Integrated email and news client
 Support for SMTP and POP protocols
 Support for newsgroups over NNTP protocol
 Spelling checker
 Automatic mail management (filter)
 MIME
 MAPI
 JavaScript
 HTML3
 HTML tables
 HTML Frames element support
 Nonstandard tags, such as 
 RSA
 PPP network stack
 Bookmark importer for Netscape

Versions

References

External links
Internet Explorer 2 Emulator, Deja Vu
Internet Explorer Architecture
Internet Explorer Community — The official Microsoft Internet Explorer Community

1995 software
Gopher clients
Internet Explorer
Macintosh web browsers
Usenet clients
Windows web browsers